Guillermo Ademir Meza Moreno (13 May 1988 – 6 May 2010) was a Mexican soccer defender. He played with Pumas Morelos of Mexico's second division.

Career
Meza began his career in 2002 with UNAM Pumas and joined Pumas Morelos in 2007. He played 17 games for Pumas Morelos and earned three caps with one goal for UNAM Pumas.

Death 
On 6 May 2010, Meza was shot in the head, after attackers chased him in a taxi and opened fire.

References 

1988 births
2010 deaths
Deaths by firearm in Mexico
Male murder victims
Mexican murder victims
People murdered in Mexico
Footballers from Mexico City
Club Universidad Nacional footballers
Mexican footballers
Association football defenders